Sokolovce is a village and municipality in Piešťany District in the Trnava Region of western Slovakia.

History
In historical records the village was first mentioned in 1293.

Sokolovce have a very rich history. In the past, they were the settlement of royal falconers. You will find here an old manor house dating back to 1705, as well as a baroque church dating from 1770. As part of the manor house there were built the wine cellars, which were the storage for the wine of the nobility of Austro-Hungarian monarchy, of descendants of the Thurz family. Since the microclimates of this wine cellar provide ideal conditions for ripening and storage of archive wines, after 1805 the estate passed into property gradually with several noblemen with business activities, who managed the wine business here until the 40s of the 20th century.
Today, the cellar is used as a private wine cellar with a capacity of approximately 10,500 bottles. The capacity of the cellar can be increased to approximately three times, to approximately 31,500 bottles.

Geography
The municipality lies at an altitude of 160 metres and covers an area of 6.574 km2. It has a population of about 1168 people.

References

External links
http://www.statistics.sk/mosmis/eng/run.html
https://vinnapivnicasokolovce.sk/

Villages and municipalities in Piešťany District